Eleutero Benjamin "Angelo" Encarnación (born April 18, 1969) is a former professional baseball player who played three seasons for the Pittsburgh Pirates and Anaheim Angels of Major League Baseball.

Career
During a game against the Los Angeles Dodgers on August 12, 1995, Encarnacion made an unusual mistake that ultimately cost the Pirates the game. Encarnacion entered the game in the top of the eleventh inning with the score tied at 10–10, as a pinch runner for the Pirates' starting catcher, Mark Parent. The Pirates failed to score, and Encarnacion remained in the game as the catcher. Later that inning, with one out and Roberto Kelly on third base, Encarnacion casually scooped up a bouncing ball with his face mask. This was a violation of MLB's rarely invoked Rule 7.05 (d), which allows runners on base to advance under that circumstance, permitting Kelly to score the game-winning run uncontested.

References

External links

1969 births
Akron Aeros players
Allentown Ambassadors players
Anaheim Angels players
Calgary Outlaws players
Dominican Republic expatriate baseball players in Canada
Dominican Republic expatriate baseball players in the United States

Living people
Major League Baseball catchers
Major League Baseball players from the Dominican Republic
Newark Bears players
Pittsburgh Pirates players
Sioux Falls Canaries players
Welland Pirates players
Augusta Pirates players
Buffalo Bisons (minor league) players
Calgary Cannons players
Carolina Mudcats players
Gulf Coast Red Sox players
Iowa Cubs players
Las Vegas Stars (baseball) players
Midland Angels players
Pawtucket Red Sox players
Salem Buccaneers players
Vancouver Canadians players
West Tennessee Diamond Jaxx players